Shambat may refer to:

Shambat (city), city in Sudan
Shambat (khan), 7th century khan of the Bulgars